Ryan Shepard Suarez (born July 28, 1977) is an American soccer player, who last played in United Soccer Leagues for the California Victory.

Born in Sacramento, Suarez graduated from Oakmont High School in nearby Roseville, California. Suarez played college soccer at San Jose State University from 1997 to 2000, and was named an NCAA All-American his senior season.  He also played for the Silicon Valley Ambassadors in the Premier Development League.

Upon graduating, Suarez was drafted 7th overall by the Dallas Burn in the 2001 MLS SuperDraft.  Suarez played very well in his debut season, starting 19 games while scoring 2 goals and 3 assists, and showing an attacking instinct and physicality that looked to make him very dangerous in Major League Soccer.  Although Suarez played consistently in his second season, starting 24 games and recording a goal and 2 assists for the Burn, his lack of improvement troubled many.  His third season brought a move to center back, which Suarez did not take happily to – in midseason, he was traded to the Los Angeles Galaxy with Paul Broome and Antonio Martínez in exchange for Ezra Hendrickson and Gavin Glinton.  Suarez's time with the Galaxy was limited by injuries, playing only 3 games.  In his fourth season, with Galaxy star defender Danny Califf out for much of the year, Suarez cemented a position in the Galaxy back line, registering 25 starts for the team, but not scoring a single point. Suarez's efforts earned him the respect of Galaxy supporters and even brought him the LA Riot Squad (LARS) Player of the Year Award.  Chivas USA acquired Suarez before the 2005 season.

Chivas USA coach Hans Westerhof subbed Suarez out in the 28th minute during the team's June 25 loss to the Kansas City Wizards; Westerhof had wanted the defense to play forward, and Suarez was not complying. A heated exchange followed, and Suarez was waived by the club two days later. He was then claimed off waivers by the MetroStars.  He was released in November 2005 after playing just 4 games for the team.

In 2006, Suarez signed with Vancouver, and helped the Caps win their first USL First Division Championship by beating the Rochester Raging Rhinos 3-0.

On May 17, 2007 Suarez signed with the California Victory.

Upon his arrival in MLS, Suarez was touted as a prospect for the US national team's right back position.  His lack of development and his move to center back, however, make it unlikely that he will see much time with the team.  Although Suarez had the option of playing for Uruguay, he committed himself to the United States, playing his only cap on May 26, 2003 against Wales.

References

External links

Sports Illustrated profile

1977 births
Living people
FC Dallas players
LA Galaxy players
Chivas USA players
New York Red Bulls players
Vancouver Whitecaps (1986–2010) players
California Victory players
Major League Soccer players
USL First Division players
United States men's international soccer players
San Jose State Spartans men's soccer players
Silicon Valley Ambassadors players
Major League Soccer All-Stars
FC Dallas draft picks
Soccer players from Sacramento, California
Association football defenders
American soccer players
All-American men's college soccer players
People from Roseville, California